Thomas Peter Rausch  (born 1941) is the T. Marie Chilton Professor of Catholic Theology and professor of theological studies at Loyola Marymount University in Los Angeles, having received his doctorate from Duke University.

A systematic theologian specializing in the areas of Christology, ecclesiology, and ecumenism, he has published 22 books and over 280 articles and reviews.  His book, Pope Benedict XVI: An Introduction to His Theological Vision, examines the theology of Benedict XVI, Pope Emeritus.

He has taught at Loyola Marymount since 1976.

In addition to his current endowed professorship at LMU, Fr. Rausch has also served as the Director of Campus Ministry, Chair of the Theological Studies Department, Associate Dean of the Bellarmine College of Liberal Arts, and Rector of the Jesuit Community. He has held visiting professorships throughout the world.

Beyond studying and writing about ecumenical theology, Fr. Rausch has also been an active participant in the ecumenical movement. In 1983–1984 he was appointed by the Secretariat for Christian Unity as Catholic Tutor to the Ecumenical Institute, the World Council of Churches study center at Bossey, Switzerland. He was a member of the U.S. Catholic/Southern Baptist Conversation 1994–2001 and one of the signatories of the Richard John Neuhaus/Charles Colson Evangelicals and Catholics Together 1997 document, "The Gift of Salvation." In 2001 he was appointed to the Roman Catholic/World Evangelical Alliance Consultation and serves as co-chair of the Los Angeles Catholic-Evangelical Committee. He presently is a member of the Anglican-Roman Catholic Consultation, USA. He also co-chairs the Theological Commission of the Archdiocese of Los Angeles.

He is frequently quoted on programs for the History Channel and other similar television channels. His writing has been heralded by fellow theologians across theological disciplines. As Peter C. Phan, the Chair of Catholic Social Thought at Georgetown University, has observed, "With his trademark clarity, accessibility, and depth, [Tom] Rausch helps us understand the essentials of our Christian faith in a church and world marked by polarization and conflict."

Selected publications

References

Christologists
20th-century American Jesuits
21st-century American Jesuits
Living people
1941 births
20th-century American Roman Catholic theologians
21st-century American Roman Catholic theologians
Duke University alumni
Loyola Marymount University faculty